In Greek mythology, Botres (Ancient Greek: Βότρης) was a Theban son of Eumelus and grandson of Eugnotus.

Mythology 
Eumelus venerated the god Apollo devotedly and honored him with generous offerings. One day, when Eumelus was sacrificing a ram to the god, Botres, who was helping around, tasted the victim's brain before the ritual was completed. Eumelus, enraged, hit Botres on the head with a brand and inflicted a fatal injury on him. As it became evident that Botres was dying, Eumelus, his wife and the servants were overcome with sorrow. Being that Eumelus was a devotee, Apollo took pity on them and changed Botres into a bird called Aeropus (bee-eater).

This myth is also briefly referenced in Ovid's Metamorphoses.

Notes

References
Anderson, William S. A commentary on Ovid's Metamorphoses, 7. 390 In: Ovid's Metamorphoses. Books 6-10. Edited, with Introduction and Commentary, by William S. Anderson. University of Oklahoma Press, 1972. - p. 285.
Antoninus Liberalis, The Metamorphoses of Antoninus Liberalis translated by Francis Celoria (Routledge 1992). Online version at the Topos Text Project.
Pierre Grimal,  A Concise Dictionary of Classical mythology. Basil Blackwell Ltd, 1990. - p. 77
 Publius Ovidius Naso, Metamorphoses translated by Brookes More (1859-1942). Boston, Cornhill Publishing Co. 1922. Online version at the Perseus Digital Library.
Publius Ovidius Naso, Metamorphoses. Hugo Magnus. Gotha (Germany). Friedr. Andr. Perthes. 1892. Latin text available at the Perseus Digital Library.

Metamorphoses into birds in Greek mythology
Theban characters in Greek mythology
Theban mythology
Deeds of Apollo